Sand Island Light, also known as Sand Island Lighthouse (and historical light station), is a decommissioned lighthouse located at the southernmost point of the state of Alabama, United States, near Dauphin Island, at the mouth of Mobile Bay, Alabama. It is located roughly 3 miles offshore from the primary Mobile Bay entrance, bounded on the east by Mobile Point and on the west by Dauphin Island.

History
The first lighthouse on Sand Island, constructed by Winslow Lewis in 1837, was a  structure completed in 1839. The lighting was provided by 14 lamps in 16 inch reflectors and a first-order lens, known as the Lewis lamp, which was a poorly designed version, or Argand-style lamp. Lewis enjoyed a monopoly through his relationship with
Stephen Pleasonton that lasted until 1853.

In 1859 a new lighthouse was completed but was destroyed during the Civil War, on February 23, 1863, by Confederate John W. Glenn. The Confederate soldiers at Fort Morgan observed Union soldiers in the lighthouse spying on the fort, and the guns of the fort opened fire totally destroying the lighthouse. In 1864 a  wooden tower was built that lasted until 1873.

Construction

Issues
Sand Island itself faced continuous erosion, to the point where granite blocks were being added to the island to try and stave off the erosion and loss of the lighthouse. Restoration efforts resulted primarily in stabilization of the island through 2008.  Sand Island Lighthouse's dire situation is similar to its "sister light", the Morris Island Lighthouse, near Charleston, South Carolina. Both lighthouses were situated on sandy islands that have eroded, leaving the towers surrounded by water.

Recent

Less than a year later the $6,000,000 restoration of the island was washed away by Hurricane Isaac.

The Dauphin Island Foundation (founded 1991) works with the Alabama Lighthouse Association acts as agent and administrator for the Sand Island Restoration Project. There are seven general directors, nine directors at large, and also includes as directors: 
Mayor, Town of Dauphin Island
President, Dauphin Island Property owners Association
President, Dauphin Island, Alabama Chamber of Commerce
President, Dauphin Island Water and Sewer Authority
President, Dauphin Island Park and Beach Board

The Sand Island Lighthouse is on the Lighthouse Digest Doomsday List, as one of the most endangered lighthouses in the country, It, and the Mobile Bay lighthouse, was damaged by Hurricane Ivan in 2004 and Hurricane Katrina in 2005.  Repairing that damage will further delay restoration efforts.

The image of this lighthouse was used as a stamp cancellation.

See also

 List of lighthouses in the United States
 Mobile Point Range Lights
 Middle Bay Light

References

Further reading
Encyclopedia of Alabama: Sand Island Lighthouse

External links
 
 
Anderson, Kraig, Lighthouse Friends, Sand Island Lighthouse.
Gordon Vernon, 2006 photograph.
Sand Island Light, Alabama Lighthouse Association.
Sand Island Preservation Group.
Sand Island Lighthouse Photos (1859–2004) and information on the Sand Island Lighthouse

Lighthouses completed in 1838
Houses completed in 1838
Lighthouses on the National Register of Historic Places in Alabama
Transportation buildings and structures in Mobile County, Alabama
National Register of Historic Places in Baldwin County, Alabama